Rajkot Airport  is a domestic airport serving the city of Rajkot, Gujarat, India. It is the 4th busiest airport in Gujarat after Ahmedabad, Surat and Vadodara.

Development
The airport presently suffers from considerable capacity restraints, due to the expansion of the city and because of the residential and commercial areas surrounded around it, which renders the plan to extend the runway further from 1,800 m unfeasible. As it is incapable of serving aircraft larger than Airbus A320 and Boeing 737 (which is the largest aircraft operating from the airport), a plan for an entirely new airport was launched and is under construction since 2018.

Prime Minister Narendra Modi presided over the groundbreaking ceremony for the new airport at Hirasar, held on 7 October 2017. Work is in progress, and it is expected to be completed by December 2023.

Airlines and destinations

Statistics

See also
 Rajkot Greenfield International Airport

References

External links
 
Rajkot Airport at the Airports Authority of India

Transport in Rajkot
Airports in Gujarat
Buildings and structures in Rajkot
Airports with year of establishment missing